Events in the year 1968 in Spain.

Incumbents
Caudillo: Francisco Franco

Births

4 January - Jesús Clavería.
30 January - Felipe VI
22 March - Javier Castillejo, boxer recognized as the WBC light-middleweight champion 1999 to 2001, and WBA middleweight champion 2006 to 2007

Full date unknown
Lidó Rico, expressive artist

Deaths

 18 February - Juan de Landa. (b. 1894)
 14 November - Ramón Menéndez Pidal. (b. 1869)

See also
 1968 in Spanish television
 List of Spanish films of 1968

References

 
Years of the 20th century in Spain
1960s in Spain
Spain
Spain